The Compton-Woods House is a historic house at 800 High St. in Little Rock, Arkansas.  It is a -story wood-frame structure, with a cross-gable roof configuration, and wooden clapboard and shingle siding.  It is a fine local example of late Queen Anne Victorian style, with a three-story square tower in the crook of an L, topped by a pyramidal roof.  Decorative cut shingles adorn the upper floor.  The interior features high quality period woodwork in mahogany, oak, and pine.  Built in 1902, it is a surviving example of houses that were typically seen in its neighborhood, just south of the Arkansas State Capitol.

The house was listed on the National Register of Historic Places in 1980.

See also
National Register of Historic Places listings in Little Rock, Arkansas

References

Houses on the National Register of Historic Places in Arkansas
Queen Anne architecture in Arkansas
Houses completed in 1902
Houses in Little Rock, Arkansas
National Register of Historic Places in Little Rock, Arkansas